PPL Center is an 8,500 seat capacity indoor sports arena in Allentown, Pennsylvania. It opened on September 10, 2014. It is the home arena for the Lehigh Valley Phantoms of the American Hockey League, the primary development hockey team for the Philadelphia Flyers. The arena also hosts major concerts, sports, and entertainment events throughout the year.

Overview

The arena was part of a larger redevelopment project of the central business district of Allentown. The project encompasses a five-acre square block area in which several new structures are planned to be erected: Part of the arena site was previously developed in the 1980s as an office building called Corporate Plaza. On February 23, 1994, it collapsed into a sinkhole, due to limestone in the ground and the decision to not place the building on a concrete pad, but rather on spread footings; the plaza was imploded on March 19 of that year. Inside the arena is a new ground-floor studio that houses WFMZ-TV's news operation.

Its naming rights are owned by the PPL Corporation, an Allentown-based company that paid an undisclosed sum over ten years for the naming rights.

History
Rebuilding an arena on the site of the Spectrum in Philadelphia was rejected in favor of the more profitable Xfinity Live! project and a new 180-room Renaissance by Marriott hotel. The competition to build a new arena for the Phantoms in 2008 was primarily between Allentown and Camden, New Jersey. While Camden was closer, Allentown had a more elaborate proposal which helped secure Allentown's bid for the team.

Plans to build the PPL Center at the corner of 7th and Hamilton Streets in Center City Allentown were announced in late 2009. For much of 2009 and 2010, the focus of the project was on securing funding. The project took a major leap forward in 2011 when several properties were purchased by the city of Allentown to help clear the way for the project to begin. By the end of January 2012, all of the properties had been purchased with final demolition of all buildings occurring in early February 2012.

Sports
The arena plays host to the Lehigh Valley Phantoms of the American Hockey League, the primary development hockey team of the Philadelphia Flyers. It had been home to the Lehigh Valley Steelhawks, an indoor football team, who played four seasons in the arena from 2015 to 2018. It also served as the site for the last remaining home games and two home playoff games for the Arena Football League's Philadelphia Soul due to the Wells Fargo Center in Philadelphia hosting the Democratic National Convention in 2016. The arena has hosted an NHL preseason game "Flyers in the Valley" every year since 2016.

Since 2016, the arena also hosts the Allentown Indoor Race, a midget car racing event of the Indoor Auto Racing Championship Series.

Parking and traffic
On May 31, 2011, a comprehensive parking analysis conducted by Traffic Planning and Design, Inc. (TPD) was submitted to Allentown Economic Development Corporation. The analysis stated the total number of parking spaces within the study area, between the public and private parking garages and surface lots, was of approximately 7,376 parking spaces. As a result of this parking analysis, the existing spaces and proposed construction of an additional 500 parking spaces to be built with this development, will adequately accommodate the highest peak period parking demands of the proposed Allentown arena and mixed-used development. In comparison, Coca-Cola Park on Allentown's east side has 2,500 parking spots available.

Also on May 31, 2011, a comprehensive traffic analysis conducted by Traffic Planning and Design, Inc. (TPD) was submitted to Allentown Economic Development Corporation. The report stated that the existing roadway infrastructure can accommodate the new traffic generated by the proposed development. Conditions will be further improved with the recommended improvements.

Controversy
Some criticism about the PPL Center centered around the cost of the arena relative to the cost of other dedicated American Hockey League arenas in the country. Nathan Benefield, the director of Public Analysis for The Commonwealth Foundation for Public Policy Alternatives, a Pennsylvania free-market think tank that opposes public funding of stadiums, believes that the PPL Center benefited from funding a plan with no cap on public money beyond the annual revenue generated by the zone. As of October 2012, $224.3 million in bonds have been sold.

Concerts/shows/events

2014

2015

2016

2017

2018

2019

2020

2021

2022

2023

See also
 Dime Savings and Trust Company (National Register of Historic Places building incorporated into the PPL Center complex)
 Farr Building (historic 1907 Allentown building)

References

External links

 Official website
 Lehigh Valley Phantoms official website

2014 establishments in Pennsylvania
Indoor arenas in Pennsylvania
Indoor ice hockey venues in Pennsylvania
Lehigh Valley Phantoms
Lehigh Valley Steelhawks
Music venues in Pennsylvania
Sports venues completed in 2014
Sports venues in Allentown, Pennsylvania